The Center for International Political Analysis (CIPA) is a research center at the Policy Research Institute (PRI) at the University of Kansas.
The primary project focus at present is on gathering information regarding the nature of inter-state relations during times of conflict in several localized areas: the Middle East, Southern, Western, and Central Africa, and the Balkans.

Purpose
Using filtered news leads in conjunction with a series of numeric codes, these inter-state relations can be quantified—both in number and intensity—through computer-aided coding.
In addition, CIPA employs several human coders to track mass atrocities throughout the world.
CIPA operates with funding from multiple sources with different research needs, although the overarching goal of the project is predictive in nature.
In all facets of the project's research, the intent is to advance efforts to understand and anticipate civil strife, genocide, and mass killings.

Project history
The Center for International Political Analysis is an outgrowth of Philip Schrodt's and Deborah Gerner's work on the Kansas Event Data System (KEDS). The initial focus of the KEDS project was the development of techniques for converting English-language reports of political events into event data.
This replaced labor-intensive and error-prone process of human coding with inexpensive, transparent and reproducible automated coding.
The centerpiece of this effort is the APSA-award-winning KEDS computer program, a Macintosh program with a user-friendly interface and a variety of output options. In support of KEDS, Schrodt and Gerner's staff produced several programs for filtering texts and aggregating the resulting event data so that it can be used in statistical analysis. The KEDS program has now been used in about half-a-dozen National Science Foundation-funded event data projects, as well as a number of dissertations and other smaller projects. The development and popularization of the KEDS software paved the way for CIPA's current framework, Tabari.

The early KEDS work focused primarily on the Levant region from the late 1980s to the late 1990s. Most of this research focused on the development of early warning techniques for political change, primarily using the Levant as a case study. The project experimented with a number of different methods, including factor analysis, discriminant analysis, an assortment of clustering algorithms, and hidden Markov models.

In recent years, grants from Science Applications International Corporation and the National Science Foundation have allowed CIPA to expand the scope of its research into Africa, Yemen, Sri Lanka, and the former Yugoslavia. In addition, these grants have facilitated a shift in the CIPA project focus. Upcoming data sets will likely reflect a greater emphasis on contentious intrastate political relations.

External links
 
 Kansas Event Data System

Research institutes of international relations
Research institutes in Kansas